Kinnaird is originally a Scottish Gaelic topographical term, ceann ard, meaning "high headland".

Kinnaird may refer to:

Places

Canada
 Kinnaird, British Columbia, a neighbourhood in Castlegar, British Columbia

Scotland
 Kinnaird, Angus, village in Angus, Scotland, location of Kinnaird Castle and birthplace of Sir James Carnegie, 5th Baronet
 Kinnaird, Atholl, village in Atholl (northern Perthshire), Scotland
 Kinnaird, Gowrie, village in Gowrie (southern Perthshire), Scotland
 Kinnaird, Stirlingshire, estate of the Bruces of Airth in Stirlingshire, Scotland, see James Bruce
 Kinnaird Head, promontory in Aberdeenshire, Scotland

People
Kinnaird is a common Scottish surname, occasionally also used as a forename:
 Kinnaird R. McKee, American United States Navy four star admiral

Other uses
 Kinnaird College for Women University, Women's college in Lahore, Punjab
 Lord Kinnaird, including a list of bearers of the title